Vladimír Bárta (born 13 January 1955) is a Czech judoka. He competed in the men's half-middleweight event at the 1980 Summer Olympics.

References

1955 births
Living people
Czech male judoka
Olympic judoka of Czechoslovakia
Judoka at the 1980 Summer Olympics
Sportspeople from Nový Jičín